Typhlonesiotes is a genus of ground beetles in the family Carabidae. This genus has a single species, Typhlonesiotes swaluwenbergi. It is found in Hawaii.

References

Trechinae
Monotypic Carabidae genera